Oscar Byström may refer to:
 Oscar Byström (composer) (1821–1909), 19th-century Swedish composer
 Oscar Byström (actor) (1857–1938), Swedish actor